Neacșu Șerbu (born 27 September 1928) was a Romanian boxer. He competed in the men's light middleweight event at the 1952 Summer Olympics.

References

External links
  

1928 births
Year of death missing
Romanian male boxers
Olympic boxers of Romania
Boxers at the 1952 Summer Olympics
Place of birth missing
Light-middleweight boxers